Zachery Williams (born 20 September 1994) is a professional Australian rules footballer playing for the Carlton Football Club in the Australian Football League(AFL). A utility, 1.85 metres tall and weighing 84 kilograms, Williams also plays as a defender and mid-fielder. Williams previously represented the Greater Western Sydney Football Club, playing 113 games over eight seasons from 2013 to 2020. He was recruited by Greater Western Sydney as the 54th pick in the 2012 AFL Rookie Draft, making his debut in round five of the 2013 AFL season. Williams earned a nomination for the 2013 AFL Rising Star award and has played the 14th most games for Greater Western Sydney Club.

Early life and family 
Williams was born and raised in Narrandera, New South Wales, to Steven Williams and Joy O'Hara.  Williams is of Aboriginal Australian (Wiradjuri) descent on his father's side and of Irish descent on his mother's side. His father died when he was six years old, and his mother was left to raise him as well as his older sister Samantha. His father remains a profound influence on Williams and his Indigenous heritage.

Williams attended Narrandera High School and grew up playing an array of sports, including basketball, rugby league, and AFL. Williams' father grew up playing rugby league, but chose to enrol Williams in Auskick as soon as he was old enough. His father believed he was more suited for the game. For financial reasons, William's mother asked him to pick just one sport at age 15. Williams chose AFL over basketball and rugby league, despite preferring basketball at the time, as he believed he was not tall enough to play professionally. His role models were fellow AFL players Adam Goodes and Michael O'Loughlin.

Junior career 
Growing up, Williams' main focus became Australian Rules Football. He played junior football for the Narrandera Eagles in the Riverina Football Netball League. At the age of 15, Williams joined Greater Western Sydney's academy program. The club's academy program allowed Williams to develop as a footballer and experience what professional football would be like. At age 17, Williams represented NSW in the AFL U18's Championship. Williams played in the 2012 Riverina Football League grand final, and was recognised as the best afield. Williams was unsuccessful in the 2012 National draft selection. Later, he was chosen by Greater Western Sydney Giants in the 2012 Rookie Draft as pick 55.

AFL career

2013 season 
In April 2013, Williams was promoted from the rookie list to the senior list. He became the first academy graduate to join GWS's list. In round five of the 2013 AFL season, Williams made his debut at age 18, representing Greater Western Sydney Giants against the Gold Coast Suns at Manuka Oval. Williams went on to play 11 games that season, and earned the round 19 nomination for the 2013 AFL Rising Star award.

2014 season 
Prior to the start of the 2014 season, Williams changed from number 51 Guernsey to number 29, following the departure of Dom Tyson.

2015 season 
On 30 May 2015, the Greater Western Sydney Giants wore specially designed Indigenous themed guernseys in their game against the Western Bulldogs to commemorate the 2015 Indigenous Round. Williams was one of six Indigenous players on the team. In the second half of the 2015 season, Williams shifted positions and played as an attacking Backman.

2016 season 
Williams represented the 22 under 22 team in the 2016 season, playing as a back. He received the unofficial title of Most Underrated player in 2016, given by champion data. He was seventh in line for the best and fairest award for Greater Western Sydney Giants in 2016. Williams received his first two Brownlow Medal votes in round two against Gold Coast Suns. This game was Williams' best performance of the season with disposals (31), total kicks (20) and inside 50s (9). Williams had a career high season in 2016, averaging 22 possessions per game.

2017 season 

On 24 May 2017, it was announced that Williams would wear number 67 on his guernsey rather than his usual 29, for the round 10 Sir Doug Nicholls Indigenous Round game against West Coast. This was to commemorate the 1967 referendum (which allowed Indigenous Australians to be counted with the general population in the national census). Earlier in the year, Williams signed a contract extension with Greater Western Sydney Giants, and was to represent them until the contract finishes at the end of the 2020 season. Several Greater Western Sydney players suffered injuries in the 2017 season. A reshuffling of positions after injuries placed Williams in as a midfielder. He achieved 28 possessions and six clearances. Following injuries of Steve Johnson and Devon Smith, Williams then played as a forward and responded with three goals against Essendon in round 11. Towards the end of the season Williams resumed his usual position as a defender, and dominated in round 21 against Western Bulldogs with disposables (27) and rebounds (50).

2018 season 
Williams was unable to play the majority of the 2018 season after rupturing his Achilles tendon in a training session, which required surgery. Williams returned to the season in the 2018 elimination-final against Sydney Swans, with disposables (23) and kicks (20).

2019 season 
Williams played 21 games in the 2019 season, only missing two due to a hamstring issue. His 100th game the 2019 season semi final against Brisbane Lions. Williams 2019 preliminary final performance was one of the great individual games of the decade He averaged a career high 24 disposals in the season and was fifth in line for the best and fairest award for Greater Western Sydney Giants. Williams played in Greater Western Sydney Club's first ever grand final against Richmond, with disposals (21), highballs (10) and uncontested possessions (13).

2020 season 
At the end of the 2020 season, Williams was at the end of a three-year contract with Greater Western Sydney Giants. Williams declined a multi-year extension contract from Greater Western Sydney club. After playing for eight seasons with Greater Western Sydney Club, Williams was classified a restricted free agent, which meant Greater Western Sydney club had the authority to match contract offers from rival clubs. On 30 September 2020, Williams accepted a six-year contract, valued at $900,000 a season from Carlton Football Club, after Greater Western Sydney Giants chose to not match the bid. Williams plans on playing as a midfielder in his career with Carlton, after showing great potential in the 2019 preliminary final against Collingwood.

2021 season 
On 20 January, Williams was given his new guernsey number at Carlton, the no.6, previously worn by Kade Simpson. Williams missed the Round 1 opener against Richmond after 
a bump in a preseason match landed him a one match ban for rough conduct.

Statistics 
Statistics are correct to the end of Round 23 2022.

|-
| scope=row | 2013 ||  || 51
| 11 || 2 || 1 || 71 || 78 || 149 || 28 || 33 || 0.18 || 0.1 || 6.5 || 7.1 || 13.6 || 2.6 || 3.0 || 0
|-
| scope=row | 2014 ||  || 29
| 8 || 2 || 3 || 63 || 52 || 115 || 28 || 21 || 0.25 || 0.4 || 7.9 || 6.5 || 14.4 || 3.5 || 2.6 || 0
|- 
| scope=row | 2015 ||  || 29
| 12 || 5 || 3 || 104 || 83 || 187 || 51 || 31 || 0.42 || 0.3 || 8.7 || 6.9 || 15.6 || 4.3 || 2.3 || 0
|-
| scope=row | 2016 ||  || 29
| 22 || 4 || 4 || 289 || 167 || 456 || 96 || 67 || 0.18 || 0.2 || 13.1 || 7.6 || 20.7 || 4.4 || 3.1 || 2
|- 
| scope=row | 2017 ||  || 29
| 23 || 7 || 8 || 302 || 208 || 510 || 75 || 89 || 0.3 || 0.4 || 13.1 || 9.0 || 22.2 || 3.3 || 3.9 || 6
|-
| scope=row | 2018 ||  || 29
| 2 || 0 || 0 || 33 || 9 || 42 || 11 || 7 || 0 || 0 || 16.5 || 4.5 || 21.0 || 5.5 || 3.5 || 0
|- 
| scope=row | 2019 ||  || 29
| 24 || 5 || 3 || 416 || 152 || 568 || 123 || 75 || 0.2 || 0.1 || 17.3 || 6.3 || 23.7 || 5.1 || 3.1 || 5
|-
| scope="row" style="text-align:center" | 2020 
| || 29
| 11 || 2 || 2 || 136 || 50 || 186 || 38 || 25 || 0.2 || 0.2 || 12.4 || 4.6 || 16.9 || 3.5 || 2.3 || 1
|-
| scope=row | 2021
|
| 6 || 14 || 5 || 4 || 201 || 63 || 264 || 55 || 26 || 0.4 || 0.3 || 14.4 || 4.5 || 18.9 || 3.9 || 1.9 || 0
|-
| scope=row | 2022
|
| 6 || 9 || 0 || 0 || 136 || 40 || 176 || 37 || 11 || 0 || 0 || 15.1 || 4.4 || 19.6 || 4.1 || 1.2 || 1
|-
|- class=sortbottom
! colspan=3 | Career
! 136 !! 32 !! 28 !! 1751 !! 902 !! 2653 !! 542 !! 385 !! 0.2 !! 0.2 !! 12.9 !! 6.6 !! 19.5 !! 4.0 !! 2.8 !! 15
|}

Honours and achievements 
Individual

 AFL Rising Star nominee: 2013
Indigenous All-Stars team: 2013
 22under22 team: 2016

References

External links

1994 births
Living people
Greater Western Sydney Giants players
Australian rules footballers from New South Wales
People from the Riverina
Indigenous Australian players of Australian rules football
Australian people of Irish descent
Carlton Football Club players
AFL Rising Star winners